"O Come, All Ye Faithful" (originally written in Latin as "") is a Christmas carol that has been attributed to various authors, including John Francis Wade (1711–1786), John Reading (1645–1692), King John IV of Portugal (1604–1656), and anonymous Cistercian monks. The earliest printed version is in a book published by Wade. A manuscript by Wade, dating to 1751, is held by Stonyhurst College in Lancashire.

The original four verses of the hymn were extended to a total of eight, and these have been translated into many languages. The English translation of "O Come, All Ye Faithful" by the English Catholic priest Frederick Oakeley, written in 1841, is widespread in most English-speaking countries.

Text
The original text of the hymn has been from time to time attributed to various groups and individuals, including St. Bonaventure in the 13th century or King John IV of Portugal in the 17th, though it was more commonly believed that the text was written by Cistercian monks – the German, Portuguese or Spanish provinces of that order having at various times been credited.

In modern English hymnals, the text is usually credited to John Francis Wade, whose name appears on the earliest printed versions. Wade, an English Catholic, lived in exile in France and made a living as a copyist of musical manuscripts which he found in libraries. He often signed his copies, possibly because his calligraphy was so beautiful that his clients requested this. In 1751 he published a printed compilation of his manuscript copies, Cantus Diversi pro Dominicis et Festis per annum. This is the first printed source for Adeste Fideles.

The version published by Wade consisted of four Latin verses. Later in the 18th century, the French Catholic priest  wrote an additional three verses in Latin. Another anonymous Latin verse is rarely printed. 

The text has been translated innumerable times into English. The most common version today is a combination of one of Frederick Oakeley's translations of the original four verses, and William Thomas Brooke's translation of the three additional verses. It was first published in Murray's Hymnal in 1852. Oakeley originally titled the song "Ye Faithful, approach ye" when it was sung at his Margaret Chapel in Marylebone (London), before it was altered to its current form. The song was sometimes referred to as the "Portuguese Hymn" after the Duke of Leeds, in 1795, heard a version of it sung at the Portuguese embassy in London. McKim and Randell nonetheless argue for Wade's authorship of the most popular English language version. Bennett Zon offers limited support for that argument, although he also suggests that the author may instead have been someone known to Wade.

Tune
Besides John Francis Wade, the tune has been attributed to several musicians, from John Reading and his son, to Handel, and even the German composer Gluck. The Portuguese composer Marcos Portugal or King John IV of Portugal have also been credited. Thomas Arne, whom Wade knew, is another possible composer. There are several similar musical themes written around that time, though it can be hard to determine whether these were written in imitation of the hymn, whether the hymn was based on them, or whether they are totally unconnected.

Published versions

The hymn was first published by John Francis Wade in his collection Cantus Diversi (1751), with four Latin verses, and music set in the traditional square notation used for medieval liturgical music. It was published again in the 1760 edition of Evening Offices of the Church. It also appeared in Samuel Webbe's An Essay on the Church Plain Chant (1782).
The hymn tune also made its way to the Sacred Harp tradition, appearing as "Hither Ye Faithful, Haste with Songs of Triumph" in an 1860 collection.
With "Herbei, o ihr Gläub'gen" a German translation of the Latin text was published in 1823 by Friedrich Heinrich Ranke.

Lyrics
These are the original four Latin verses as published by Wade, along with their English translation by Frederick Oakeley.

These are the additional Latin verses composed in the 18th century, with English prose translations, not from Oakeley:

Claims of Jacobite connections
Although, as previously stated, the hymn’s exact sources and origins remain unproven, there is universal agreement among musicologists that it was through the efforts of Catholic layman and music copyist John Francis Wade that it first appeared in print. Wade himself fled to France after the Jacobite rising of 1745 was crushed, and his liturgical books were often decorated with Jacobite imagery (for context, the aim of the rebellion had been to restore a Catholic monarch — Charles Edward Stuart, popularly known as “Bonnie Prince Charlie” — to the throne of England). These aspects of Wade’s life and political leanings have given rise to speculation that he might have intended for Adeste Fideles to be a ciphered birth ode to the Jacobite’s Young Pretender.

This theory regarding the hymn’s meaning has been most recently proposed by Professor Bennett Zon, head of music at Durham University. It essentially holds that “the song’s original Latin version was actually a coded rallying cry for the Steward cause”. Elements of this theory include:

The as-yet-unproven but popular claim that “Bethlehem” was a common Jacobite cipher for England.
The claim (also currently unproven) that Wade deliberately meant for the title Regem Angelorum — which is found in the hymn’s original Latin lyrics and translates literally to “King of Angels” — to refer to the king of England via a pun on the Latin words “Angelorum” (“of the angels”) and “Anglorum” (“of the English”).
The fact that during the mid-18th century some English Roman Catholic liturgical books would place Adeste Fideles physically close to prayers for the would-be king in exile.

Proponents of this theory interpret the notions and circumstances described above as evidence that the lyrics of Adeste Fideles are meant to be “a call to arms for faithful Jacobites to return with triumphant joy to England (Bethlehem) and venerate the king of angels, that is, the English king (Bonnie Prince Charlie).” However, certain historical circumstances would seem to disprove or at least problematize the Jacobite ode theory. Namely:

 The absence of any textual evidence that can conclusively prove that Wade explicitly composed Adeste Fideles as a piece of political propaganda. In the absence of such evidence, the Jacobite imagery found in Wade’s books might be merely an expression of the author’s idiosyncratic blend of political and religious thought, which in turn might have reflected the sentiments of Catholic Jacobites as a group.
 Sources that credit the hymn’s composition to Wade overlook the fact that the exact origins of Adeste Fideles are uncertain. It is not known whether Wade might have simply copied the hymn from other sources (for instance, it could have been composed by Cistercian monks and eventually sung at the Portuguese embassy chapel in London), or to what extent he might have innovated on the contributions of the hymn’s other plausible authors.
 Most of the hymn’s original lyrics are an almost-verbatim expression of Roman Catholic dogmas regarding the person of Jesus Christ. As stated elsewhere in this article, the hymn takes almost all its contents from Bible verses and the Nicene Creed. Indeed, the evidence that the hymn is merely an artistic expression of the Catholic spiritual and intellectual tradition is so readily evident that the Irish musicologist William H. Grattan Flood concluded that the words and music of the song “are to be attributed to a Catholic source and for Catholic worship”.

Performance
In performance, verses are often omitted – either because the hymn is too long in its entirety or because the words are unsuitable for the day on which they are sung. For example, the eighth anonymous verse is only sung on Epiphany, if at all; while the last verse of the original is normally reserved for Christmas Midnight Mass, Mass at Dawn or Mass during the Day.

In the United Kingdom and United States it is often sung today in an arrangement by Sir David Willcocks, which was originally published in 1961 by Oxford University Press in the first book in the Carols for Choirs series. This arrangement makes use of the basic harmonisation from The English Hymnal but adds a soprano descant in verse six (verse three in the original) with its reharmonised organ accompaniment, and a last verse harmonisation in verse seven (verse four in the original), which is sung in unison.

This carol has served as the penultimate hymn sung at the Festival of Nine Lessons and Carols by the Choir of King's College, Cambridge, after the last lesson from Chapter 1 of the Gospel of John.

Adeste Fideles is traditionally the final anthem during Midnight Mass at St. Peter's Basilica in the Vatican.

See also
 List of Christmas carols

References

External links 

 
 
 Free sheet music of "O Come, All ye Faithful" for SATB from Cantorion.org
 Adeste Fideles, two 19th-century arrangements
 Original Latin, English translation, historical notes
 , sung to David Willcocks' arrangement by the Georgia Boy Choir

Christmas carols
Catholic music
English Christian hymns
Hymn tunes
Songs about Jesus
18th-century hymns in Latin
Charles Edward Stuart
Jacobite songs
Hymns in The English Hymnal
Latin Christmas carols